Lynchford is a locality and was a stopping place on the Mount Lyell railway to Strahan, to the south of Queenstown in the Queen River valley. 

It was in its early days a gold mine location.

It is now a stopping place on the West Coast Wilderness Railway.

Station sequence
 Queenstown
 Lynchford
 Rinadeena
 Dubbil Barril
 Teepookana
 Regatta Point

Notes

Queenstown, Tasmania
West Coast Wilderness Railway
Railway stations in Western Tasmania